Kimberly ("Kim") Barrett (born November 18, 1981 in Montego Bay, Saint James Parish) is a Puerto Rican shot putter. Her personal best throw is 18.28 metres, achieved in May 2004 in Gainesville. She originally represented Jamaica. She changed nationality to Puerto Rico in 2006.

For Jamaica she won the bronze medal at the 2005 Central American and Caribbean Championships, and competed at the 2004 Olympic Games and the 2005 World Championships without reaching the final.

Competition record

References

sports-reference

1981 births
Living people
Puerto Rican shot putters
Jamaican female shot putters
Athletes (track and field) at the 2003 Pan American Games
Athletes (track and field) at the 2004 Summer Olympics
Olympic athletes of Jamaica
People from Montego Bay
Pan American Games competitors for Jamaica